Ricardo Romero (born April 15, 1978) is an American professional mixed martial arts fighter. He was a featured competitor on multiple occasions for the Ring of Combat promotion which featured on HDNet Fights and also competed for their Light Heavyweight title. Romero was also a competitor in the Ultimate Fighting Championship.

A native of South Brunswick, New Jersey, Romero wrestled while at South Brunswick High School.

Mixed martial arts career

Early career

After going 5–0 in the promotion, Romero fought Glen Sandull for the vacant Ring of Combat Light Heavyweight championship. Midway through the second round, Romero caught Sandull with an illegal soccer kick and was disqualified, handing him his first ever professional loss, whilst also gifting Sandull the title.

Five months later, Romero returned against Brendan Barrett in a fight to declare the number one contender to the belt Romero missed out on. Romero won via submission (rear naked choke) after 0:44 of the second round.

Romero next faced future Ultimate Fighter and UFC competitor James McSweeney which once again aired on HDNet Fights. Romero won his second successive submission victory via rear naked choke.

This was followed by a victory over The Ultimate Fighter 8 competitor Karen Grigoryan and Romero once again won, this via TKO (punches) in the second round. This win earned him the Light Heavyweight title.

Romero fought twice more for the Ring of Combat, defending his ROC Light Heavyweight title, winning both by submission (one by kimura, one by keylock).

Bloodyelbow also declared him a "rising star" in their list of desired fighters for the UFC Light Heavyweight division.

Ultimate Fighting Championship

Romero joined the UFC in June 2010 and was set to face former World Extreme Cagefighting Light Heavyweight champion Steve Cantwell at UFC 116. However, despite receiving medical clearance, Cantwell had to withdraw and the bout was cancelled. Romero instead faced Seth Petruzelli at UFC 116 on the live prelim show on Spike TV. In the second round, Romero caught Petruzelli in an armbar that injured his arm forcing him to tap, giving Romero the win.

Romero faced Kyle Kingsbury on February 5, 2011 at UFC 126.  He lost the fight via TKO due to strikes just 21 seconds into the first round.

Romero faced James Te-Huna on September 24, 2011 at UFC 135.  He lost the fight via KO only forty-seven seconds into the first round.

After the loss, Romero was released from the promotion.

Bellator

Romero was then scheduled to make his Bellator debut against Tim Carpenter at Bellator 65. However the fight was cancelled prior to the event for unknown reasons.

Personal life
Romero has a son and was remarried in 2022.

Championships and accomplishments

Mixed martial arts
Ring of Combat
Ring of Combat Heavyweight Championship (One time)
Ring of Combat Light Heavyweight Championship (One time)
One successful title defense

Mixed martial arts record

|-
| Loss
|align=center| 11–3
| James Te Huna
| KO (punches)
| UFC 135
| 
|align=center| 1
|align=center| 0:47
| Denver, Colorado, United States
|
|-
| Loss
|align=center| 11–2
| Kyle Kingsbury
| TKO (knees to the body and punches)
| UFC 126
| 
|align=center| 1
|align=center| 0:21
| Las Vegas, Nevada, United States
| 
|-
| Win
|align=center| 11–1
| Seth Petruzelli
| Submission (straight armbar)
| UFC 116
| 
|align=center| 2
|align=center| 3:05
| Las Vegas, Nevada, United States
| 
|-
| Win
|align=center| 10–1
| Silmar Rodrigo
| Submission (americana)
| Ring of Combat 27
| 
|align=center| 1
|align=center| 4:56
| Atlantic City, New Jersey, United States
| 
|-
| Win
|align=center| 9–1
| Rich Lictawa
| Submission (kimura)
| Ring of Combat 26
| 
|align=center| 2
|align=center| 2:14
| Atlantic City, New Jersey, United States
| 
|-
| Win
|align=center| 8–1
| Karen Grigoryan
| TKO (punches)
| Ring of Combat 25
| 
|align=center| 2
|align=center| 2:50
| Atlantic City, New Jersey, United States
| 
|-
| Win
|align=center| 7–1
| James McSweeney
| Submission (rear-naked choke)
| Ring of Combat 24
| 
|align=center| 1
|align=center| 2:27
| Atlantic City, New Jersey, United States
| 
|-
| Win
|align=center| 6–1
| Brendan Barrett
| Submission (rear-naked choke)
| Ring of Combat 23
| 
|align=center| 2
|align=center| 0:44
| Atlantic City, New Jersey, United States
| 
|-
| Loss
|align=center| 5–1
| Glen Sandull
| DQ (illegal knee)
| Ring of Combat 21
| 
|align=center| 2
|align=center| 2:50
| Atlantic City, New Jersey, United States
| 
|-
| Win
|align=center| 5–0
| Costas Philippou
| Decision (split)
| Ring of Combat 19
| 
|align=center| 3
|align=center| 5:00
| Atlantic City, New Jersey, United States
| 
|-
| Win
|align=center| 4–0
| Randy Durant
| TKO (punches)
| Ring of Combat 18
| 
|align=center| 1
|align=center| 1:13
| Atlantic City, New Jersey, United States
| 
|-
| Win
|align=center| 3–0
| John Doyle
| TKO (punches)
| ROC 17: Beast of the Northeast Finals
| 
|align=center| 1
|align=center| 3:19
| Atlantic City, New Jersey, United States
| 
|-
| Win
|align=center| 2–0
| John Clarke
| TKO (corner stoppage)
| ROC 16: Beast of the Northeast Semi-Finals
| 
|align=center| 1
|align=center| 4:00
| Atlantic City, New Jersey, United States
| 
|-
| Win
|align=center| 1–0
| Bryce Harrell
| TKO (submission to punches)
| ROC 15: Beast of the Northeast Quarterfinals
| 
|align=center| 1
|align=center| 2:09
| Atlantic City, New Jersey, United States
|

References

External links

UFC Profile

Living people
Light heavyweight mixed martial artists
Mixed martial artists utilizing wrestling
1978 births
American male mixed martial artists
Mixed martial artists from New Jersey
People from South Brunswick, New Jersey
South Brunswick High School (New Jersey) alumni
Sportspeople from Middlesex County, New Jersey
Ultimate Fighting Championship male fighters